Daphnia is one of the three subgenera of the genus Daphnia, the others being Australodaphnia and Ctenodaphnia.

Species

Daphnia ambigua Scourfield, 1947
Daphnia arenata Hebert, 1995
Daphnia catawba Coker, 1926
Daphnia cavicervix Ekman, 1900
Daphnia cheraphila Hebert & Finston, 1996
Daphnia commutata Ekman, 1900
Daphnia cristata Sars, 1862
Daphnia cucullata Sars, 1862
Daphnia curvirostris Eylmann, 1887
Daphnia dentifera Forbes, 1893
Daphnia dubia Herrick, 1883
Daphnia galeata Sars, 1864
Daphnia gessneri Herbst, 1967
Daphnia hyalina Leydig, 1860
Daphnia lacustris Sars, 1862
Daphnia laevis Birge, 1879
Daphnia latispina Kořínek & Hebert, 1996
Daphnia longiremis Sars, 1862
Daphnia longispina (O. F. Müller, 1776)
Daphnia lumholtzi Sars, 1885
Daphnia marcahuasensis (Valdivia Villar & Burger, 1989)
Daphnia melanica Hebert, 1995
Daphnia mendotae Birge, 1918
Daphnia middendorffiana Fischer, 1851
Daphnia minnehaha Herrick, 1884
Daphnia morsei Ishikawa, 1895
Daphnia neoobtusa Hebert, 1995
Daphnia obtusa Kurz, 1874
Daphnia oregonensis Kořínek & Hebert, 1996
Daphnia parvula Fordyce, 1901
Daphnia peruviana Harding, 1955
Daphnia pileata Hebert & Finston, 1996
Daphnia prolata Hebert & Finston, 1996
Daphnia pulex Leydig, 1860
Daphnia pulicaria Forbes, 1893
Daphnia retrocurva Forbes, 1882
Daphnia rosea Sars, 1862
Daphnia sinevi Kotov, Ishida & Taylor, 2006
Daphnia tanakai Ishida, Kotov & Taylor, 2006
Daphnia thorata Forbes, 1893
Daphnia turbinata Sars, 1903
Daphnia umbra Taylor et al., 1996
Daphnia villosa Kořínek & Hebert, 1996

A number of species inquirendae are also included in the subgenus:

Daphnia arcuata Forbes, 1893
Daphnia arenaria Forbes, 1893
Daphnia bairdii Forest, 1879
Daphnia caudata Sars, 1863
Daphnia caudata Sars, 1863
Daphnia clathrata Forbes, 1893
Daphnia denticulata Birge, 1879
Daphnia elongata Woltereck, 1932
Daphnia ezoensis Uéno, 1972
Daphnia frigidolimnetica Ekman, 1904
Daphnia gibbera Kortchagin, 1887
Daphnia intexta Forbes, 1890
Daphnia latipalpa Moniez, 1888
Daphnia litoralis Sars, 1890
Daphnia macraocula Kiser, 1950
Daphnia mitsukuri Ishikawa, 1896
Daphnia monacha (Brehm, 1912)
Daphnia nasuta Herrick, 1884
Daphnia parapulex Woltereck, 1932
Daphnia propinqua Sars, 1895
Daphnia pulicarioides Burckhardt, 1899
Daphnia pulicoides Woltereck, 1932
Daphnia schmackeri Poppe, 1890
Daphnia schoedleri Sars, 1862
Daphnia sonkulensis Manujlova, 1964
Daphnia titicacensis Birge, 1909
Daphnia typica Mackin, 1931
Daphnia ventrosa Kortchagin, 1887
Daphnia whitmani Ishikawa, 1896
Daphnia zschokkei Stingelin, 1894

References

Cladocera
Animal subgenera